Anthology is a 2001 greatest hits album by American death metal band Obituary. It contains songs recorded during the band's early career, from 1989's Slowly We Rot to 1997's Back from the Dead. The compilation also contains two previously unreleased tracks, recorded in 1998 before the band separated.

Track listing
All music by Obituary except where noted

Charts

Monthly

Personnel 
 John Tardy - vocals (all tracks)
 Allen West - lead guitar (tracks 2, 3, 4, 5, 10 - 20)
 JP Chartier - lead guitar (track 1)
 Trevor Peres - rhythm guitar (all tracks)
 Daniel Tucker - bass (tracks 1 - 5)
 Frank Watkins - bass (tracks 6 - 20)
 Donald Tardy - drums (all tracks)

References

2001 greatest hits albums
Obituary (band) albums
Roadrunner Records compilation albums